Monash University Publishing is a university press supported by Monash University (Melbourne, Australia). The press was originally founded in 2003 as the "Monash University ePress" before it was re-organized by Nathan Hollier in 2010 and renamed "Monash University Publishing". The press is a member of the Association of University Presses.

See also

 List of English-language book publishing companies
 List of university presses

References

External links 
Monash University Publishing

2010 establishments in Australia
Monash University
Publishing companies established in 2010
Monash University Publishing